Paranhos is a municipality located in the Brazilian state of Mato Grosso do Sul. Its population was 14,404 (2020) and its area is 1,302 km². It is known for having registered snowfalls at least two times (in 1975 and 2013), an extremely rare phenomenon in Brazil outside the regions of South and Southeast.

References

Municipalities in Mato Grosso do Sul